Anipocregyes is a genus of longhorn beetles of the subfamily Lamiinae, containing the following species:

 Anipocregyes laosensis Breuning, 1964
 Anipocregyes multifasciculatus Breuning, 1939

References

Mesosini
Cerambycidae genera